Charles Lewis Radin is an American mathematician, known for his work on aperiodic tilings and in particular for defining the pinwheel tiling and, with John Horton Conway, the quaquaversal tiling.

Education and career
Radin did his undergraduate studies at City College of New York, graduating in 1965, and then did his graduate studies at the University of Rochester, earning a Ph.D. in 1970 under the supervision of Gérard Emch. Since 1976 he has been on the faculty of the University of Texas at Austin.

Awards and honors
In 2012 he became a fellow of the American Mathematical Society.

Selected publications
.
.
.
.
as editor with Mark J. Bowick, Govind Menon, and David Kinderlehrer: Mathematics and Materials, American Mathematical Society 2017

References

External links
Home page

Year of birth missing (living people)
Living people
20th-century American mathematicians
21st-century American mathematicians
City College of New York alumni
University of Rochester alumni
University of Texas at Austin faculty
Fellows of the American Mathematical Society